The 2003 Crawley Borough Council election took place on 1 May 2003 to elect members of Crawley Borough Council in West Sussex, England. One third of the council was up for election and the Labour Party stayed in overall control of the council.

After the election, the composition of the council was:
Labour 22
Conservative 8
Liberal Democrats 2

Election result
Overall turnout at the election was 23.16%.

Ward results

References

2003 English local elections
2003
2000s in West Sussex